Sivrihisar Aviation Center, Necati Artan Facilities, is an airpark located at Sivrihisar district of Eskişehir Province in Turkey.

History 
The construction was carried out in three phases. In the first phase, which consisted of a -long runway, two hangars and operation buildings, was completed in 2014. The airpark became operational in March 2014. In the second phase, additional hangars, and in the final phase a lodging facility for 80 persons were built in 2015.

Features
Beside the runway, there is a turf runway for gliders and light aircraft. The airpark features two aprons, one in the west and another one in the east. The west apron occupies  concrete ground. There are hangars of various private companies, technical offices and Aeronautical Information Service. Opened in 2018, the airpark hosts the M.S.Ö. Air & Space Museum at the west apron. Many aircraft in the museum's inventory are ready to fly. The east apron is reserved for air shows.

Events
Events like flight training, parachuting training  and aeromodelling are also held at the airpark. 

The biggest event organized at the airpark is the annual SHG Airshows, which was attended by 56,000 in 2019. Other events organized include SHY Air Race, Fly-Inn, Children's Day Paper Plane Contest and Flying Villages.

References

Airports in Turkey
Sivrihisar District
2013 establishments in Turkey
Airports established in 2014
Residential airparks
Gliderports